Bavayia montana, also known as the mountain New Caledonian gecko or montane bavayia is a gecko endemic to the main mountain ranges of Grande Terre in New Caledonia.

References

Bavayia
Reptiles described in 1913
Taxa named by Jean Roux